Looking for Danger is a 1957 American comedy film directed by Austen Jewell and starring the comedy team of The Bowery Boys.  The film was released on October 6, 1957 by Allied Artists and is the forty-sixth film in the series.

Plot
Duke recounts the days of when he and the rest of the Bowery Boys served in World War II. During the war, the boys' sergeant, who gets fed up with Duke and Sach, gladly gives them the duties of a suicide mission. The duo goes under cover as German soldiers to deliver a message to a sultan.

Cast

The Bowery Boys
Huntz Hall as Horace Debussy 'Sach' Jones
Stanley Clements as Stanislaus 'Duke' Covelske
David Gorcey as Charles 'Chuck' Anderson
Jimmy Murphy as Myron
Eddie LeRoy as Blinky

Remaining cast
Dick Elliott as Mike Clancy
Lili Kardell as Shareen
Richard Avonde as Col. Ahmed Tabari
Otto Reichow as Wolff
Michael Granger as Sidi-Omar
Peter Mamakos as Hassan
Joan Bradshaw as Zarida
George Khoury as Mustapha
Henry Rowland as Wetzel
Harry Strang as Watson
Paul Bryar as Harper
Jane Burgess as Sari
John Harmon as Lester Bradfield
Michael Vallon as Waiter

Cast notes
Dick Elliott now takes over for the role of Mike Clancy.
Jimmy Murphy ('Myron')'s last Bowery Boys film.

Home media
Warner Archives released the film on made-to-order DVD in the United States as part of "The Bowery Boys, Volume Three" on October 1, 2013.

See also
 List of American films of 1957

References

External links

1957 films
1957 comedy films
American black-and-white films
Bowery Boys films
American comedy films
Allied Artists films
1950s English-language films
1950s American films